Kenneth Gordon Romuld (May 26, 1919 – October 6, 1994) was a Canadian politician. He served in the Legislative Assembly of Saskatchewan from 1964 to 1967 as member of the Liberal party.

References

1919 births
1994 deaths
20th-century Canadian politicians
Saskatchewan Liberal Party MLAs